Com Plex is the first album by indie rock band The Helio Sequence. It was released on September 5, 2000, on Cavity Search Records. It contains a cover of the Beatles song "Tomorrow Never Knows".

Critical reception
The New York Times wrote that "layers of echoing guitars and whirring, swooping synthesizers make the music shimmer like an Impressionist landscape, edgeless and enveloping."

Track listing
 "Stracenska 612" – 5:42
 "Just Mary Jane" – 4:47
 "Transistor Radio" – 5:23
 "My Heart" – 5:41
 "Sassafras" – 6:35
 "Stitches Sewing" – 2:36
 "Tomorrow Never Knows" – 4:10
 "Big Jet Sky" – 4:33
 "Demographics" – 6:01

Personnel
 The Helio Sequence - Producer, Engineer, Mastering, Mixing
 Brandon Summers - Guitar, Vocals
 Benjamin Weikel - Drums, Keyboards, Vocals
 Juleah Weikel - Artwork, Graphic Design, Graphic Layout

References

Com Plex
Com Plex
Cavity Search Records albums